After the Heat is a 1978 album by Brian Eno, Dieter Moebius and Hans-Joachim Roedelius (the latter two being the core members of Cluster), credited to "Eno Moebius Roedelius". The album represents the second collaboration by the trio, the first being 1977's Cluster & Eno. As with the previous album, After the Heat was created in collaboration with the influential krautrock producer Conny Plank.

Content
The track "Tzima N'Arki" contains a reversed vocal track, part of which includes the chorus of Eno's song "King's Lead Hat" (from his album Before and After Science), itself an anagram of "Talking Heads", whose recordings Eno was producing during that period. "Broken Head" makes prominent use of tape flanging on Eno's declaimed vocal.

Reception

Comparing the album to the musicians' previous collaboration Cluster & Eno (1977), Pitchfork wrote in their favourable retrospective review: "A few piano-centered instrumentals hint at the sound of the earlier record, but After The Heat exists in a fantastic sphere of its own." Trouser Press called the album "an alluring — occasionally compelling — collection of instrumentals that deftly avoid the pitfalls of ambient music".

Track listing
All songs composed by Brian Eno, Dieter Moebius and Hans-Joachim Roedelius.

Side A
"Oil" – 4:12
"Foreign Affairs" – 3:30
"Luftschloß" – 3:10
"The Shade" – 3:08
"Old Land" – 4:10

Side B
"Base & Apex" – 4:29
"Light Arms" – 1:29
"Broken Head" – 5:25
"The Belldog" – 6:16
"Tzima N'Arki" – 4:30

The above list presents the tracks in the order they appeared on the original LP release. Some CD issues have an alternative running order.

Personnel
 Brian Eno – vocals, bass guitar, synthesizers, keyboards
 Dieter Moebius – synthesizers, keyboards
 Hans-Joachim Roedelius – synthesizers, keyboards
 Holger Czukay – bass guitar on "T'zima N'arki"

Technical personnel
 Conny Plank – engineer
 Michael Weisse – cover photography

References

Works cited

External links
 

1978 albums
Brian Eno albums
Cluster (band) albums
Albums produced by Conny Plank
Albums produced by Brian Eno
Hans-Joachim Roedelius albums